Kitgum is a municipality in Kitgum District in the Northern Region of Uganda. The town is administered by Kitgum Municipality Council, an urban local government. It is the largest metropolitan area in the district and the site of the district headquarters.

Location
Kitgum is bordered by Lamwo District to the north, Mucwini to the north-east, Kitgum Matidi to the east, Acholibur to the south, and Pajimu to the west. The geographical coordinates of Kitgum are 3°17'20.0"N, 32°52'40.0"E (Latitude:3.288889; Longitude:32.877778).

Population
On 27 August 2014, the national population census put the population of Kitgum town at 44,604.

Points of interest
The following additional points of interest are located within or near the town of Kitgum:

Acaki Lodge,  mid range lodge with 10 chalets built of local materials and thatching, 2 tents, a conference facility and gardensset out on an expansive 20 acre leafy plain on the banks of Alango Stream, Acaki Lodge was constructed on what was formerly a garbage dump. It is a conservation miracle as the land has now been turned into a green park.
Kitgum Hospital, a 200-bed public hospital administered by the Uganda Ministry of Health
 St. Joseph's Hospital Kitgum, a 300-bed community hospital administered by the Roman Catholic Archdiocese of Gulu
 offices of Kitgum Town Council
 Kitgum central market
 Irene Gleeson Foundation Headquarters, the first school started by Irene Gleeson and serving over 3,000 students
 Rwekunye–Apac–Aduku–Lira–Kitgum–Musingo Road, the  mile road passing through the middle of town
 National Memory and Peace Documentation Centre

See also
 Acholi people
 List of cities and towns in Uganda
 Okello Oryem
 Olara Otunnu

References

External links
 Epidemic of Hepatitis E in Kitgum and Environs

Populated places in Northern Region, Uganda
Cities in the Great Rift Valley
Kitgum District
Acholi sub-region